State Road 112 (SR 112) is a  east–west state highway connecting Miami International Airport in Miami to Miami Beach in the U.S. state of Florida. Between the airport and Interstate 95, it is locally known as the Airport Expressway (or the Airport Tollway), and is an all-electronic toll road between State Road 9 to I-95. Between I-95 and Alton Road (SR 907A) in Miami Beach, SR 112 is signed only as Interstate 195 as it crosses Biscayne Bay by way of the Julia Tuttle Causeway. Between I-195 and its eastern terminus at Collins Avenue (SR A1A), the SR 112 signs are present but infrequent, and the road is locally maintained as Arthur Godfrey Road.

Route description

Airport Expressway

SR 112 begins at the main entrance of Miami International Airport, at the intersection of NW 21st Street and State Road 953 (Le Jeune Road), and heads north. From here until the interchange with I-95, the road is known as the Airport Expressway and is maintained by the Miami-Dade Expressway Authority (MDX). For its first mile or so, the road runs parallel to SR 953 and an airport runway, with its lanes featuring a divided left-hand driving direction. The road swings to its main east-west orientation past the airport, with its lanes crossing to a normal driving direction just to the east of its partial interchange with SR 948, which also provides limited access to U.S. Route 27.

After crossing NW 37th Avenue, the Airport Expressway passes through its first of two toll gantries, charging $0.35 for vehicles with SunPass transponders and $0.70 for the remaining Toll-by-Plate users. It also runs roughly parallel to the Metrorail Orange Line, crossing under it just west of NW 32nd Avenue. SR 112 then interchanges with SR 9 (NW 27th Avenue), and then NW 22nd Avenue half a mile later. From here, the expressway passes through the second toll gantry (at the location of the former toll plaza), charging the same rates as the first gantry. Near this gantry, SR 112 passes the southern side of the Earlington Heights Metrorail station, where the two lines of the Metrorail system merge, with both the Airport Expressway and the Metro continuing to run parallel eastwards for another  or so. Just before SR 112's partial interchange with SR 933 (NW 12th Avenue), the Metrorail tracks cross over the Airport Expressway as they curve southwards. About  later, the Airport Expressway ends at the stack interchange with I-95 (alternatively known as the 36th Street Interchange), with SR 112 and the pavement continuing eastwards as Interstate 195.

I-195

The  section of SR 112 connecting Interstate 95 in the west with Miami Beach in the east is also designated as I-195. This portion of the route is signed as I-195, with SR 112 becoming an unsigned highway. I-195 and SR 112 cross Biscayne Bay by way of the Julia Tuttle Causeway. At SR 907A (Alton Road), I-195 terminates while SR 112 continues east as Arthur Godfrey Road.

At-grade section

East of Alton Road, SR 112 continues as the palm-lined Arthur Godfrey Road (also known as West 41st Street), an undivided  four-lane road. It passes through the southern end of Nautilus, past shops and low-rise office buildings, crossing the Biscayne Waterway before passing along the southern edge of North Beach Elementary School. Continuing past more shops and a hotel, SR 112 crosses the Intracoastal Waterway before immediately meeting the southbound half of SR A1A. Past here, the road becomes one lane in each direction and meets the northbound half of SR A1A one block later, terminating amidst the high-rises of Mid-Beach. 41st Street continues on a short distance into a cul-de-sac.

Tolls
Tolls on the Airport Expressway are all electronic, meaning there are no cash transactions. Payment is done either via SunPass transponders or via toll-by-plate billing, the latter of which charges double of the former. Two toll gantries are located along the expressway portion of the road, each charging $0.35 for SunPass users and $0.70 for Toll-by-Plate. As of November 15, 2014, it costs $0.70 to travel the entire expressway portion via SunPass (and $1.40 via Toll-by-Plate). All motorists are charged at least one toll for using the road; there are no "free sections" as existed prior to the electronic toll conversion in 2014.

History

Construction of SR 112 began in 1959, and the expressway was opened to traffic on December 23, 1961 (six months after the Palmetto Expressway, SR 826). Its initial name was the 36th Street Tollway, but use of the name eventually faded in favor of the more popular "Airport Expressway". Initially the toll road had its western terminus at the congested intersection with LeJeune Road (SR 953), Northwest 36th Street (SR  48), and Okeechobee Road (US 27 / SR 25) just east of the airport. It wasn't until 1990 when SR 112 was extended southward and westward onto the airport property, terminating at the main entrance.

The numbering of SR 112 is an anomaly in the current grid-based system. The road was assigned its number while it was in its planning stages; it retained the number as FDOT made widespread changes in the numbering of State Roads in southeastern Florida in the 1970s and early 1980s.

On November 15, 2014, the Airport Expressway became an all electronic toll road, no longer collecting cash, and the only ways to pay are either by the SunPass transponders or billing by the toll-by-plate program, at double the cost. This also eliminated all "free movement" sections of the tolled section of SR 112, and restored tolls westbound, which had been removed in March 1984. This change was first announced in 2010, and along with the nearby Dolphin Expressway, SR 112 was the last of the MDX expressways to be converted to open road tolling.

Interstate 195 Spur
On December 23, 1961, three signed roads along the route of SR 112 were opened: the 36th Street Tollway, Interstate 195, and Spur Interstate 195.  I-195 Spur was the surface portion of the east–west state route along Arthur Godfrey Road in Miami Beach, connecting I-195's eastern terminus to SR A1A. The I-195 Spur signs disappeared from the road shortly after the designation was decommissioned by the newly formed United States Department of Transportation in the late 1960s, and is now signed solely (but scarcely) as SR 112.

Future

While repeated attempts to secure funding for extending SR 112 along SR 948 to the Palmetto Expressway and the Homestead Extension of Florida's Turnpike have failed, the Florida Department of Transportation is constructing a connector between the Dolphin Expressway and the Airport Expressway as part of a massive project (the Miami Intermodal Center) tying together expressways, rail lines, and the airport. It remains to be seen if the connector will have its own FDOT designation or if the SR 112 will be extended over it to connect the Miami area's two primary east–west expressways.

Exit list
All exits not concurrent with I-195 are unnumbered.

References

External links

FDOT GIS data
Florida @ SouthEastRoads - Interstate 195 and Florida 112

State highways in Florida
State Roads in Miami
Toll roads in Florida
State Roads in Miami-Dade County, Florida
Hialeah, Florida
State Roads in Miami Beach, Florida
1961 establishments in Florida